Kooringal is a suburb of Wagga Wagga, New South Wales, Australia. Kooringal is thought to mean "Side of a Hill" in the Wiradjuri aboriginal language. Kooringal is located approximately 4 km from the CBD along Lake Albert Road. Kooringal is the basis for growth in the eastern section of Wagga Wagga. Kooringal High School, on Ziegler Avenue is the largest secondary school in Wagga Wagga. The Kooringal area is also home to other schools including Kooringal Public School, Sturt Public School and the Sacred Heart School. Kooringal has a large suburban shopping centre known as Kooringal Mall and it consists of a Woolworths supermarket, McDonald's, Subway, Domino's Pizza, Australia Post retail store and various specialty stores.

History
The suburb of Kooringal was a dairy and grazing property and homestead in the 1960s which was also named Kooringal. Kooringal was at one point called Henwood Park Settlement due to the extensive area subdivided by pastoralist, Stan Henwood. "Darrung" Post Office established in Henwood Park Settlement at the request of locals however the name disappeared when the Wagga Wagga City Council named the suburb Kooringal after the property. Stage one of The Kooringal Mall with ten shops was established in October 1968 and stage two was completed in August 1971 with another nine shops added.

Gallery

Notes and references

External links

Suburbs of Wagga Wagga